Danilov Pochinok is a rural locality (a village) in Moseyevskoye Rural Settlement, Totemsky District, Vologda Oblast, Russia. The population was 220 as of 2002.

Geography 
Danilov Pochinok is located 55 km northwest of Totma (the district's administrative centre) by road. Meleshovo is the nearest rural locality.

References 

Rural localities in Tarnogsky District